Tittesworth Reservoir is a water storage reservoir near Leek, Staffordshire, England, fed by the River Churnet. The reservoir and associated water treatment works are owned and operated by Severn Trent Water. The reservoir was built in 1858 and extended in 1963. Tittesworth is the second largest reservoir by volume in the county of Staffordshire. The Peak District Boundary Walk runs past the reservoir.

References

Poo

External links
 Official Site

Nature reserves in Staffordshire
Reservoirs of the Peak District
Staffordshire Moorlands
Reservoirs in Staffordshire